Barnett Township is a township in Jefferson County, Pennsylvania, United States. The population was 254 at the 2010 census. It was named for Jefferson County pioneer Joseph Barnett.

Geography
Barnett Township occupies the northwestern corner of Jefferson County and is bordered to the north by Forest County and to the west by Clarion County. The Clarion River, a westward-flowing tributary of the Allegheny River, forms the northern border of the township and the Forest County line.

Pennsylvania Route 36 crosses the township, leading northwest to Leeper and south to Brookville, the Jefferson county seat. Pennsylvania Route 899 leads north from PA 36 towards Marienville.

Demographics

As of the census of 2000, there were 272 people, 124 households, and 79 families residing in the township.  The population density was 18.7 people per square mile (7.2/km).  There were 378 housing units at an average density of 26.0/sq mi (10.0/km).  The racial makeup of the township was 99.63% White, and 0.37% from two or more races. Hispanic or Latino of any race were 0.37% of the population.

There were 124 households, out of which 25.8% had children under the age of 18 living with them, 55.6% were married couples living together, 4.8% had a female householder with no husband present, and 35.5% were non-families. 31.5% of all households were made up of individuals, and 12.1% had someone living alone who was 65 years of age or older.  The average household size was 2.19 and the average family size was 2.75.

In the township the population was spread out, with 20.2% under the age of 18, 5.1% from 18 to 24, 26.1% from 25 to 44, 32.0% from 45 to 64, and 16.5% who were 65 years of age or older.  The median age was 45 years. For every 100 females, there were 97.1 males.  For every 100 females age 18 and over, there were 99.1 males.

The median income for a household in the township was $30,500, and the median income for a family was $34,375. Males had a median income of $27,083 versus $20,625 for females. The per capita income for the township was $15,840.  About 17.1% of families and 17.6% of the population were below the poverty line, including 22.8% of those under the age of 18 and 6.5% of those 65 or over.

References

Townships in Jefferson County, Pennsylvania
Townships in Pennsylvania